Bank of Credit and Commerce International SA v Ali [2001] UKHL 8 is an English contract law case in the House of Lords on the limits of freedom of contract, and the contra proferentem principle.

Facts
Mr Naaem, an employee of BCCI SA, claimed damages for economic loss after not having been able to find a job following his redundancy in 1990. BCCI, once the world’s 7th largest bank, had gone insolvent after mass fraud because of the stigma. However, Naaem and other employees had signed a release form saying the redundancy pay was ‘in full and final settlement of any claims... of whatsoever nature that exist or may exist’. BCCI argued Naaem was bound.

Judgment
The House of Lords by a majority held that because the exposure of fraud would not have been contemplated when Mr Naeem signed, the release did not actually, despite the words, excluded a stigma damages claim.

See also

English contract law

References

English contract case law